The Lebanese Youth Movement – LYM
(Arabic: حركة الشباب اللبنانية | Harakat al-Shabab al-Lubnaniyya), also known as the Maroun Khoury Group (MKG), was
a Christian far-right militia which fought in the 1975-77 phase of the Lebanese Civil War.

Origins

The LYM was founded in the early 1970s as an association of Maronite right-wing university students, who strongly opposed the 1969 Cairo Agreement and the presence of Palestine Liberation Organization (PLO) guerrilla factions in Lebanon, by Bashir Maroun el-Khoury (nom de guerre "Bash Maroun"), the son of the former head of the Dekwaneh district of East Beirut, Naim el-Khoury.

Political beliefs
Being violently anti-communist and anti-Palestinian, the group's ideology stemmed from the extremist Phoenicist identities espoused by the Guardians of the Cedars.

The LYM in the 1975-77 civil war
The LYM/MKG joined the Lebanese Front in January 1976 and raised its own militia with training, funds and weapons being provided by the Kataeb Party and Israel.  It consisted of about 500-1,000 fighters, backed by a small mechanized force made of ex-Lebanese Army Panhard AML-90 armoured cars and gun trucks or 'technicals'. The latter consisted of commandeered Land-Rover series II-III, Santana Series III (Spanish-produced version of the Land-Rover series III), Toyota Land Cruiser (J40), Dodge W200 Power Wagon, Dodge D series (3rd generation), GMC Sierra Custom K25/K30 and Chevrolet C-10/C-15 Cheyenne light pickups armed with heavy machine guns, recoilless rifles and anti-aircraft autocannons.  Personally commanded by Bash Maroun, they usually operated in the Ras-el-Dekwaneh, Ain El Remmaneh and Mansouriye districts, manning the local sections of the Green Line, but also fought in other areas (namely at the Battle of the Hotels), earning a reputation of fierce combatants.

Controversy
However, they were also renowned for their brutality. In January–August 1976, a force of 100 LYM/MKG militiamen took part in the sieges and subsequent massacres of the Palestinian refugee camps situated at the coastal town of Dbayeh in the Matn District, and at Karantina, Al-Maslakh and Tel al-Zaatar in East Beirut. At the latter battle, the LYM/MKG intensified the blockade of the refugee camp by launching on 22 June a full-scale military assault alongside the Phalangists that lasted for 35 days, and the cruelty displayed by LYM/MKG members' in this assault and other atrocities, earned them the unflattering nickname "The Ghosts of the Cemeteries" (Arabic: أشباح المقابر | 'Ashbah al-Maqabir) – Bash Maroun's men were normally seen wearing necklaces made from human body parts cut from their victims.

Disbandement
The LYM/MKG was subsequently absorbed into the Lebanese Forces structure in 1977, thereafter ceasing to exist as an independent organization. Under LF command, they later again played a key role in the eviction of the Syrian Army out from the Christian-controlled East Beirut in February 1978 during the Hundred Days' War.

See also 
Al-Tanzim
Guardians of the Cedars
Lebanese Forces
Lebanese Front
Lebanese Civil War
List of weapons of the Lebanese Civil War
Tel al-Zaatar Massacre
Karantina Massacre
Kataeb Regulatory Forces
Phoenicianism

Notes

References 

 Denise Ammoun, Histoire du Liban contemporain: Tome 2 1943-1990, Éditions Fayard, Paris 2005.  (in French) – 
Helena Cobban, The Palestinian Liberation Organisation: People, Power, and Politics, Cambridge University Press, 1984. 
 Fawwaz Traboulsi, A History of Modern Lebanon: Second Edition, Pluto Press, London 2012.  
 Jean Sarkis, Histoire de la guerre du Liban, Presses Universitaires de France - PUF, Paris 1993.  (in French)
 Jonathan Randall, The Tragedy of Lebanon: Christian Warlords, Israeli Adventurers, and American Bunglers, Just World Books, Charlottesville, Virginia 2012. 
 Rex Brynen, Sanctuary and Survival: the PLO in Lebanon, Boulder: Westview Press, Oxford 1990.  – 
Robert Fisk, Pity the Nation: Lebanon at War, London: Oxford University Press, (3rd ed. 2001).  – 
 Marius Deeb, The Lebanese Civil War, Praeger Publishers Inc., New York 1980. 
 Samir Kassir, La Guerre du Liban: De la dissension nationale au conflit régional, Éditions Karthala/CERMOC, Paris 1994.  (in French)
Walid Kazziha, Palestine in the Arab dilemma, Taylor & Francis, 1979. 
 William W. Harris, Faces of Lebanon: Sects, Wars, and Global Extensions, Princeton Series on the Middle East, Markus Wiener Publishers, Princeton 1997. , 1-55876-115-2

Secondary sources

 Moustafa El-Assad, Civil Wars Volume 1: The Gun Trucks, Blue Steel books, Sidon 2008. 
 Samer Kassis, 30 Years of Military Vehicles in Lebanon, Beirut: Elite Group, 2003. 
 Samer Kassis, Véhicules Militaires au Liban/Military Vehicles in Lebanon 1975-1981, Trebia Publishing, Chyah 2012.

External links
 http://www.ouwet.com/n10452/news/bash-maroun-rip/ 
Guardians of the Cedars official site 
Histoire militaire de l'armée libanaise de 1975 à 1990 (in French)
Chamussy (René) – Chronique d’une guerre: Le Liban 1975-1977 – éd. Desclée – 1978 (in French)

Israeli–Lebanese conflict
Lebanese Front
Factions in the Lebanese Civil War